Kent-Delord House, also known as Kent-Delord House Museum, is a historic home located at Plattsburgh in Clinton County, New York.  It was built in 1797 and is reputedly the oldest house in Plattsburgh. It is a two-story, rectangular plan, wood frame dwelling with a gable roof.  It features a one-story, pedimented entrance porch and inside end brick chimneys. It is open as a local history museum.

It was listed on the National Register of Historic Places in 1971.

References

External links
Kent-Delord House Museum

Houses on the National Register of Historic Places in New York (state)
Historic house museums in New York (state)
Houses completed in 1797
Houses in Clinton County, New York
Museums in Clinton County, New York
National Register of Historic Places in Clinton County, New York